Lexcycle was a software company that made electronic book reading software. They were responsible for Stanza, which ran on the iPhone, iPod Touch, Microsoft Windows and Apple Macintosh platforms. In April 2009, Lexcycle was acquired by Amazon.com. In 2012, Amazon.com removed Stanza from all app stores.

See also
 E-book

References

External links 
Lexcycle (Internet Archive)

Amazon (company) acquisitions
Electronic publishing
Library 2.0
Book websites